Mputu (literally "Europe" in Kikongo) is a surname of Congolese origin. Notable people with the surname include:
Fidèle Nsielele Zi Mputu (born 1950), Congolese theologian and catholic priest
Liz Mputu, Congolese-American artist
Trésor Mputu (born 1985), Congolese footballer 
Véro Tshanda Beya Mputu, Congolese actress

Kongo-language surnames